Athletics competitions at the 2001 Bolivarian Games were held at the Pista Atlética Huachi-Loreto in Ambato, Ecuador, between September 12 and 15, 2001.

Gold medal winners from Ecuador were published by the Comité Olímpico Ecuatoriano.
A total of 47 events were contested, 24 by men and 23 by women.

Medal summary

Medal winners were published.

Men

Women

Medal table (unofficial)

References

Athletics at the Bolivarian Games
International athletics competitions hosted by Ecuador
Bolivarian Games
2001 in Ecuadorian sport